In differential geometry, an almost symplectic structure on a differentiable manifold  is a two-form  on  that is everywhere non-singular.  If in addition  is closed then it is a symplectic form.

An almost symplectic manifold is an Sp-structure; requiring  to be closed is an integrability condition.

References 

Smooth manifolds
Symplectic geometry